Patrick William Rooke was the Bishop of Tuam, Killala, and Achonry in the Church of Ireland. He has formally retired on 31 October 2021.

Born on 12 April 1955, he was educated at Sandford Park School and Salisbury and Wells Theological College; and ordained in 1979. He began his ecclesiastical career with curacies in Newtownabbey and Ballywillan, then held incumbencies at Craigs and Ballymore. He was Dean of Armagh from 2006 until 2011.

References

1955 births
People educated at Sandford Park School
Alumni of Salisbury Theological College
21st-century Anglican bishops in Ireland
Bishops of Tuam, Killala, and Achonry
Living people